Pinctada is a genus of saltwater oysters, marine bivalve mollusks in the family Pteriidae. These pearl oysters have a strong inner shell layer composed of nacre, also known as "mother of pearl".

Pearl oysters are not closely related to either the edible oysters of family Ostreidae or the freshwater pearl mussels of the families Unionidae and Margaritiferidae.

Pinctada margaritifera and P. maxima are used for culturing South Sea and Tahitian pearls. They are cultured widely primarily in the central and eastern Indo-Pacific. A pearl oyster can be seen on the reverse side of the 1,000-peso note of the Philippines.

Species of commercial value

All species within the genus produce pearls. Attempts have been made to harvest pearls commercially from many Pinctada species.  However, the only species that are currently of significant commercial interest are:
 Gulf pearl oyster, Pinctada radiata; Persian Gulf, Red Sea, Mediterranean Sea and throughout the Indo-Pacific as far as Japan and Australia.
 Black-lip oyster, Pinctada margaritifera; Persian Gulf and southwestern part of Indian Ocean; Fiji; Tahiti; Myanmar; Baja California; Gulf of Mexico
 Gold-lip oyster, Pinctada maxima; Australia; Fiji; Tahiti; 
 White-lip oyster, Pinctada maxima; Australia; Fiji; Tahiti; Myanmar; 
 Pinctada mazatlanica; Mexico; Panama;
 Akoya pearl oyster, Pinctada fucata (also called P. martensii), Red Sea; Sri Lanka; Persian Gulf; Indian Ocean; Western Pacific Ocean; Australia; China; Venezuela;
 Shark Bay pearl oyster Pinctada albina; Australia

The various species of Pinctada produce different maximum sizes and colors of pearls, depending on the size of the species and the natural color of the nacre inside the shell.  Black South Sea pearls, or Tahitian pearls come from the black-lip oyster; white and golden South Sea pearls from the white-lip and golden-lip oysters; and Akoya cultured pearls from Pinctada fucata martensii, the Akoya pearl oyster.

Pearls are also obtained in commercial quantities from some species of the closely related winged oyster genus Pteria.

Pearls are also produced from freshwater mussel species unrelated to pearl oysters. These freshwater species include Hyriopsis cumingii, Hyriopsis schlegelii, and a hybrid of the two species.

At danger from the large demand for pearls, the typical lifespan of a pearl oyster is usually around 3 years to 14 years. Pinctada maxima are seeded at about 2 years of age and take 2 years to fully develop a pearl.  They can be reseeded up to 3 or 4 times.  Akoya pearls are harvested after about 9 to 16 months.

Research carried out by biologist Aldemaro Romero Jr. allowed him to discover that the first animal population depleted by Europeans in the American continent was a pearl oyster species (Pinctada imbricata) off the coast of Venezuela. He analyzed historical records and used information about the biology of these and other species to explain its rapid disappearance.

Species list
The World Register of Marine Species includes the following species in the genus:

 Pinctada albina (Lamarck, 1819) – Shark Bay pearl oyster
 Pinctada capensis (Sowerby III, 1890)
 Pinctada chemnitzii (Philippi, 1849)
 Pinctada cumingii (Reeve, 1857)
 Pinctada fucata (Gould, 1850) – Akoya pearl oyster – now accepted as Pinctada martensii fucata  
 Pinctada galtsoffi Bartsch, 1931
 Pinctada imbricata Röding, 1798 – Gulf pearl oyster
 Pinctada inflata (Schumacher, 1817)
 Pinctada longisquamosa (Dunker, 1852)
 Pinctada maculata (Gould, 1850)
 Pinctada margaritifera (Linnaeus, 1758) – Black-lip oyster
 Pinctada maxima (Jameson, 1901) – White-lip oyster or gold-lip oyster
 Pinctada mazatlanica (Hanley, 1856)
 Pinctada nigra (Gould, 1850)
 Pinctada petersii (Dunker, 1852)
 Pinctada radiata (Leach, 1814) – Atlantic pearl-oyster – now accepted as Pinctada radiata 
 Pinctada reeveana (Dunker, 1872)
 Pinctada sugillata (Reeve, 1857)
 Pinctada vidua (Gould, 1850)

References

External links

 
 OBIS Indo-Pacific molluscan database entry for Pinctada

Pteriidae
Bivalve genera
Commercial molluscs
Taxa named by Peter Friedrich Röding